Seret is a tabia or municipality in the Dogu'a Tembien district of the Tigray Region of Ethiopia. The tabia centre is in Inda Maryam Qorar village, located approximately 11 km to the southwest of the woreda town Hagere Selam.

Geography 
The tabia occupies a (locally wide) structural flat on the foot of the Tsatsen plateau, along the main road. It occupies a saddle position between the Upper Tanqwa and Zeyi River gorges. The highest location is the Tsatsen plateau (culminating at 2810 m a.s.l.) and the lowest place near Zeyi cave (2180 m a.s.l.).

Geology 

From the higher to the lower locations, the following geological formations are present:
 Upper basalt
 Interbedded lacustrine deposits
 Lower basalt
 Amba Aradam Formation
 Antalo Limestone

Geomorphology and soils 
On the basalt rocks, the red-black soil catena is widespread: reddish soils such as Luvisols in the uplands and dark Vertisols in the plain around Inda Maryam. Here, the Vertisols are covered with stones, what evidences the vertic movements; they are also very prone to gully erosion.
The main geomorphic unit is the Hagere Selam Highlands. Corresponding soil types are:
 Associated soil types 
 shallow soils with high stone contents (Skeletic Cambisol, Leptic Cambisol, Skeletic Regosol)
 moderately deep dark stony clays with good natural fertility (Vertic Cambisol)
 deep, dark cracking clays, temporarily waterlogged  during the wet season (Pellic Vertisol)
 Inclusions
 Rock outcrops and very shallow soils (Lithic Leptosol)
 Rock outcrops and very shallow soils on limestone (Calcaric Leptosol)
 Deep dark cracking clays with very good natural fertility, waterlogged during the wet season (Chromic Vertisol, Pellic Vertisol)
 Shallow stony dark loams on calcaric material (Calcaric Regosol, Calcaric Cambisol)
 Brown loamy soils on basalt with good natural fertility (Luvisol)

Climate and hydrology

Climate and meteorology 
The rainfall pattern shows a very high seasonality with 70 to 80% of the annual rain falling in July and August. Mean temperature in Inda Maryam is 17 °C, oscillating between average daily minimum of 9.4 °C and maximum of 24.3 °C. The contrasts between day and night air temperatures are much larger than seasonal contrasts.

Rivers 
The Giba River and its tributary the Tanqwa are the most important rivers in the surroundings of the tabia. They flow towards Tekezze River and further on to the Nile. These rivers have incised deep gorges which characterise the landscape.
The drainage network of the tabia is organised as follows:
 Giba River
 Zeyi River, at the border of tabias Simret and Walta
 Zeleqwa River, which becomes Ruba Dirho near Seret, and Tanqwa River, in the woredas Kola Tembien and Abergele (woreda)
 Tsech'i River, in tabias Seret, Menachek and Aregen
 May Dechena, with its source in Inda Maryam
Whereas they are (nearly) dry during most of the year, during the main rainy season, these rivers carry high runoff discharges, sometimes in the form of flash floods. Especially at the beginning of the rainy season, they are brown-coloured, evidencing high soil erosion rates.

Springs 
As there are no permanent rivers, the presence of springs is of utmost importance for the local people. The main springs in the tabia are:
 Dechena in Inda Maryam Qorar
 May Weyni in the homonymous village
 May Ch’ech’ati in a gorge draining the Tsatsen plateau

Water harvesting 
In this area with rains that last only for a couple of months per year, reservoirs of different sizes allow harvesting runoff from the rainy season for further use in the dry season. 
 Traditional surface water harvesting ponds, particularly in places without permanent springs, called rahaya
 Horoyo, household ponds, recently constructed through campaigns

Settlements 
The tabia centre Inda Maryam Qorar holds a few administrative offices, a health post, a primary school, and some small shops. Saturday is the market day. There are a few more primary schools across the tabia. The main other populated places are:
 May Weyni
 Addi Mishahan
 Mezegat
 Duwele
 Mashih
 May Ch’iwara
 Haddush Addi (shared with Mika'el Abiy)
The latter two villages are the highest villages of this part of Tigray, on the Tsatsen plateau, at an elevation of approximately 2800 metres.

Agriculture and livelihood 
The population lives essentially from crop farming, supplemented with off-season work in nearby towns. The land is dominated by farmlands which are clearly demarcated and are cropped every year. Hence the agricultural system is a permanent upland farming system. The farmers have adapted their cropping systems to the spatio-temporal variability in rainfall.
The introduction of apples for cultivation in backyards by smallholder farmers was especially successful in Mashih, some 5 km to the east of Inda Maryam.

History and culture

History 
The history of the tabia is strongly confounded with the history of Tembien.

Religion and churches 
Most inhabitants are Orthodox Christians. The following churches are located in the tabia:
 Maryam Qorar
 Maryam Mashih
 Abune Selama, on a mountain peak at the boundary to Mika'el Abiy
 Addi Mishahan Mika'el

Inda Siwa, the local beer houses 
In the main villages, there are traditional beer houses (Inda Siwa), often in unique settings, where people socialise. Well known in the tabia are
 Tiwres Hailesillasie at Inda Maryam Qorar
 Tsehaynesh Abate at Inda Maryam Qorar
 Kidan Gebreayezgi at Inda Maryam Qorar

Roads and communication 
The main road Mekelle – Hagere Selam – Abiy Addi crosses the tabia. There are regular bus services to these towns. Further, a rural access road links Mashih, Mezegat and Duwele to the main asphalt road.

Schools 
Almost all children of the tabia are schooled, though in some schools there is lack of classrooms, directly related to the large intake in primary schools over the last decades. Schools in the tabia include Mashih school.

Tourism 
Its mountainous nature and proximity to Mekelle make the tabia fit for tourism. As compared to many other mountain areas in Ethiopia the villages are quite accessible, and during walks visitors may be invited for coffee, lunch or even for an overnight stay in a rural homestead. In Inda Maryam Qorar there are very basic hotels, mainly used by pilgrims on their way to Dabba Hadera monastery.

Touristic attractions 
 Tsatsen plateau with views

Geotouristic sites 
The high variability of geological formations and the rugged topography invite for geological and geographic tourism or "geotourism". Geosites in the tabia include:
 Inda Maryam extensive Vertisol area
 Views to adjacent gorges
 Apple cultivation in Mashih
 Exclosures managed by “Trees for Farmers” in the northeast of the tabia

Trekking routes 
Trekking routes have been established, with starting point in Inda Maryam Qorar'. The tracks are not marked on the ground but can be followed using downloaded .GPX files.
 Trek 7, to Debre Sema'it rock church, and on to Abiy Addi
 Trek 8, from Tsatsen, through Inda Maryam to Zeyi cave and on the Giba River gorge
 Trek 8V, to Dabba Hadera monastery
 Trek 19, to Debre Sema'it rock church, and on to Agbe

See also 
 Dogu'a Tembien district.

References 

Populated places in the Tigray Region
Dogu'a Tembien